TheJournal of Dental Biomechanics is a peer-reviewed academic journal that covers in the field of materials science applied to dentistry. The editors-in-chief are Christoph Bourauel (University of Bonn) and Theodore Eliades (University of Zurich). It was established in 2009 and published by SAGE Publications. The journal has stopped publications since 2015.

Abstracting and indexing
The Journal of Dental Biomechanics is abstracted and indexed in:
 Biotechnology Research Abstracts
 Calcium and Calcified Tissue Abstracts
 PubMed

External links

Dental Implants

SAGE Publishing academic journals
English-language journals
Dentistry journals
Materials science journals
Quarterly journals
Publications established in 2009